Town Kelloe is a small village in County Durham, in England. It is situated a short distance to the east of Kelloe.

References

External links

Villages in County Durham
Kelloe